Shammer is a small village beside the village of Kilkelly in County Mayo, Ireland.

References

See also
 List of towns and villages in Ireland

Towns and villages in County Mayo
Articles on towns and villages in Ireland possibly missing Irish place names